Asheim is a Norwegian surname. Notable people with the surname include: 

Henrik Asheim (born 1983), Norwegian politician for the Conservative Party  
Lester Asheim (1914–1997), American Professor of Library Science 
Nils Asheim (1895–1966), Norwegian politician for the Liberal Party  
Steve Asheim (born 1970), American drummer and songwriter

See also
Asheim, Norway, Sunnfjord, Sogn og Fjordane, Norway

Norwegian-language surnames